Arceuthobium microcarpum, called the "western spruce dwarf mistletoe," is a parasitic plant known only from Arizona and New Mexico. It is found mostly on spruce trees (Picea spp.) but also occasionally on Rocky Mountain bristlecone pine (Pinus aristata Engelm.). The specific epithet "microcarpum" means "small fruited," in reference to the berries, which are only 3.5 mm long.

Arceuthobium microcarpum (Engelm.) Hawksw. & Wiens, Brittonia 22(3): 268. 1970. = Arceuthobium douglasii var. microcarpum Engelm. in Rothr., Rep. U.S. Geogr. Surv., Wheeler vol. 6, Botany 253. 1879. = Arceuthobium campylopodum subsp. microcarpum (Engelm.) Nickrent, Phytoneuron 2012–51: 10. 2012. = Razoumofskya microcarpa (Engelm.) Wooton & Standl., Contr. U.S. Natl. Herb. 19: 179. 1915.

References

microcarpum
Parasitic plants
Flora of Arizona
Flora of New Mexico